The NCAA Division II Men's Soccer Championship is the annual tournament held by the NCAA to determine the top men's Division II college soccer program in the United States. It has been played annually since 1972; prior to that, all teams competed in a single class.

The most successful program has been Southern Connecticut State, with six national titles.

The current champion are Franklin Pierce, who won their first national title in 2022, defeating CSU Pueblo, 2–0, in the final.

Format
The Division II tournament is structured around four unbalanced Super Regionals from the eight NCAA regions (Atlantic, Central, East, Midwest, South, South Central, Southeast, and West). At least two and as many as six teams from each region are selected with no automatic qualifiers given. The selection criteria used is similar to that used in Division I, although one difference is that the RPI is replaced with the Quality of Winning Percentage Index, a more subjective measure. In 2016, the tournament field consisted of a 38-team, single-elimination tournament.

The first two rounds are played on campus sites with the highest seed usually hosting the regional semis and finals. The winners of each region meet in the third round and/or quarterfinals, with the host being determined by specific criteria or, failing that, geographical rotation. The final two rounds are played at a predetermined site. The 2016 semifinals and final, for example, were held at Swope Soccer Village in Kansas City, Missouri and hosted by the Mid-America Intercollegiate Athletics Association and the Kansas City Sports Commission.

Finals hosting history
From 1982 through 2002, the highest seeded finalist or semifinalist school was designated as the host for the finals. The University of Tampa has hosted the finals seven times, more than any other school. Florida International is the only school to have hosted four championships in a row. The championship final has been played in the state of Florida on 22 occasions, 18 more time than any other state. On seven occasions the host team has won the championship.

Schools in italics are no longer Division  II members.

Years in bold indicate when the host school won championship

Champions
References: 

# = Later vacated by NCAA.

Teams ranked by titles 

 Schools highlighted in yellow have reclassified athletics from NCAA Division II. All such schools are currently Division I members except Pfeiffer, now in Division III. Alabama A&M no longer sponsors men's soccer.
 Schools highlighted in pink have closed or discontinued athletics.

Schools ranked by number of appearances 

Schools indicated in pink no longer compete in Division II.

Former Division II Champions now in Division I
Source: 

Conference affiliations are current for the upcoming 2022 NCAA men's soccer season.

In addition to the above schools, Alabama A&M moved to Division I after winning Division II titles in 1977 and 1979. However, it discontinued its men's soccer program after the 2010 season.
Adelphi also moved to Division I in 1976, after winning the Division II title in 1974, but returned to Division II in 2013.

See also 
 List of NCAA Division II men's soccer programs
 NCAA Men's Division II Soccer Tournament appearances by school
 NCAA Men's Soccer Championships (Division I, Division III)
 NCAA Women's Soccer Championships (Division I, Division II, Division III)
 NAIA national men's soccer championship
 Intercollegiate Soccer Football Association

References

External links